Fischbach (Bad Schwalbach) is a village southwest of the city of Bad Schwalbach in Rheingau-Taunus-Kreis, Germany. It is separated from Bad Schwalbach by the  Western Aartaunus  area. The district was first documented in 1220. The name "Fischbach" derives from "Vissebach", meaning "the brook that flows through the meadows."

People from Fischbach 
 Johann Philipp Wagner (1799-1879), German merchant and inventor

References

External links
 Home page

Rheingau-Taunus-Kreis
Villages in Hesse